Hélène Jourdan-Morhange (30 January 1888 – 15 May 1961) was a French classical violinist.

Biography 
Née Hélène Morhange, she married the French painter Jacques Jean Raoul Jourdan (born 22 June 1880 in Paris), who died at the Battle of Verdun 25 March 1916.

An interpreter inspired by the works of her contemporaries, she was noticed as early as 1917 by Maurice Ravel, of whom she became a friend and favourite interpreter. In 1927, Ravel dedicated to her his Violin Sonata No. 2 and ensured the premiere of the Sonata for Violin and Cello in 1922.

She was the companion of the painter and engraver , whom she presented to Ravel.

With arthritis in her hands, she had to end her career early.

Publications 

 Ravel et nous, Éditions du Milieu du monde, Geneva, 1945, (Biography of Maurice Ravel, with a foreword by Colette and illustrated by Luc-Albert Moreau).
 Ravel d'après Ravel, Éditions du Cervin, Lausanne, 1953; a work reissued by Jean Roy, Ravel d'après Ravel suivi de Rencontres avec Vlado Perlemuter, éditions Alinéa, 1989, 159 pages.
 (Publication from radio interviews with Vlado Perlemuter around their common master and friend, Maurice Ravel.)

20th-century French women classical violinists
1888 births
1961 deaths